Zootoca carniolica is a species of lizard in the family Lacertidae.  It is found in Slovenia, Italy, Austria, and Croatia.

References

Zootoca
Reptiles described in 2000
Taxa named by Werner Mayer (herpetologist)
Taxa named by Wolfgang Böhme (herpetologist)
Taxa named by Wolfgang Bischoff